Lily K. Donaldson (born September 17, 1999) is an American beauty pageant titleholder from Memphis, Tennessee, who was crowned Miss United States 2022. She is an advocate for STEM and Arts education for disadvantaged K-12 students. 

Donaldson previously held the titles of Miss Memphis United States 2021, Miss Tennessee United States 2021, and Miss New York United States 2022. Donaldson was crowned Miss United States in her hometown on October 16, 2022.

Early life and education 
Donaldson was born on September 17, 1999, in Indianapolis, Indiana and grew up in Memphis, Tennessee. She attended Bolton High School, a Title 1 school part of the Memphis-Shelby County school district which had defunded arts programs and a 95% math proficiency fail rate. Donaldson is a first-generation college student. She is currently a Ph.D. student at Rensselaer Polytechnic Institute studying controlled environment agriculture within a School of Architecture Built Ecologies program. She studies plant electrophysiology and is part of Rensselaer Polytechnic's Institute for Energy, the Built Environment, and Smart Systems (EBESS). Donaldson also has a Bachelor of Science in Computer Science from American University and a Master of Science in Lighting from Rensselaer Polytechnic Institute. Donaldson has previously worked for the United States Department of Homeland Security and under grant from the NASA DC Space Grant Consortium.

STEM and Arts Education Advocacy 
Donaldson directs a nonprofit based in Memphis, Tennessee called Art Technically which promotes STEM (Science, Technology, Engineering, and Math) and Arts education for disadvantaged students at Title 1 and rural K-12 schools. She was inspired to found Art Technically after attending Title 1 schools with underserved arts and science programs. Art Technically provides disadvantaged K-12 students with free STEM and Arts workshops, free STEM and STEAM books, STEM and Arts themed toy donations including teddy bears in scientist costumes, or "Science Bears", and a program called Love Letters, where students learn to code Valentine's Day cards for Meals on Wheels programs. Art Technically also hosts a science-journalism program for students funded by Society for Science. In 2022, Donaldson guest-wrote an article about her work with Art Technically for the U.S. Department of Education.

Pageantry 
Donaldson has competed in the Miss United States, Miss America, and Miss USA pageant systems.

Within the Miss United States pageant system, Donaldson has held the titles of Miss Memphis US 2021, Miss Tennessee US 2021, Miss New York US 2022, and Miss United States 2022. On October 16, 2022, Donaldson was crowned Miss United States at the Cannon Center for the Performing Arts in Memphis, Tennessee. At Miss United States 2021, while representing Tennessee, Donaldson placed 2nd runner-up and received the People's Choice award.

Within the Miss America pageant system, Donaldson has held the titles of Miss Mid-South’s Outstanding Teen 2015 (Tennessee), Miss Tipton County’s Outstanding Teen 2016 (Tennessee), Miss District of Columbia State Finalist 2018 and 2019, and Miss Franklin County 2022 (Tennessee). She performed Irish Dance for her talent and won awards for charitable fundraising and the 3rd-place Women in Business interview award at Miss Tennessee 2022 and the STEM Award at Miss District of Columbia 2019.

References

Beauty pageant winners
1999 births
Living people
People from Memphis, Tennessee
American University alumni
Rensselaer Polytechnic Institute alumni
American beauty pageant winners